Ware Creek School is a historic Rosenwald school building located at Blounts Creek, Beaufort County, North Carolina.  It was built in 1921, and is a one-story rectangular structure with a hipped roof and projecting front pavilions. The main block of the building consists of three classrooms and a projecting central "industrial classroom" under a gable roof.  The building exhibits American Craftsman design influences. It ceased use as a school in 1954.

It was listed on the National Register of Historic Places in 1996.

References

African-American history of North Carolina
Rosenwald schools in North Carolina
School buildings on the National Register of Historic Places in North Carolina
School buildings completed in 1921
Schools in Beaufort County, North Carolina
National Register of Historic Places in Beaufort County, North Carolina
1921 establishments in North Carolina